Wojsławiec may refer to the following places in Poland:

Wojsławiec, Kuyavian-Pomeranian Voivodeship
Wojsławiec, West Pomeranian Voivodeship